Alfonso Mejía Silva (16 November 1934 – 29 December 2021) was a Mexican actor. He was best known for his lead role as "Pedro" in Los Olvidados (known in English as The Young and the Damned), for which he won the Best Child Actor award at the Cannes Film Festival in 1951. Director Luis Buñuel chose Mejía for the part. After a successful career in the 1950s and 1960s in Mexico, Mejia retired from the acting industry.

Personal life and death 
Mejía Silva died on 29 December 2021, at the age of 87.

Filmography
 1970 Rubí
 1970 Las bestias jóvenes
 1969 La frontera de cristal (television series)
 1969 Arriba las manos
 1968 Por mis pistolas
 1967 Frontera (TV series)
 1967 Detectives o ladrones..? (Dos agentes innocentes)
 1967 Serenata en noche de luna
 1967 Los tres mosqueteros de Dios
 1965 Always Further On
 1965 Río Hondo Miguel
 1964 Los novios de mis hijas
 1962 Los falsos héroes
 1962 Contra viento y marea
 1962 The Young and Beautiful Ones
 1962 Juventud sin Dios (La vida del padre Lambert)
 1961 Mañana serán hombres
 1961 Machine Gun Man
 1961 Vacations in Acapulco
 1961 Chicas casaderas
 1960 Puños de Roca
 1960 Quinceañera Pancho
 1959 La edad de la tentación
 1958 The Boxer
 1956 Juventud desenfrenada
 1955 El túnel 6
 1953 Padre nuestro
 1952 Mi esposa y la otra
 1952 El mártir del Calvario
 1951 La bienamada
 1950 Los Olvidados

References

External links

1934 births
2021 deaths
Male actors from Mexico City
Mexican male film actors